Avumile Mnci (born 18 December 1991) is a South African cricketer. He is a right-handed batsman and a wicketkeeper.

He made his first class debut for Border against Northerns  on 5 January 2016.

He made his List A debut for Borders against Northerns  on 8 January 2016.

In September 2018, he was named in Northern Cape's squad for the 2018 Africa T20 Cup.

References

External links
 

1991 births
Living people
South African cricketers
Border cricketers
Northern Cape cricketers